Andrachne is a genus of flowering plants in the family Phyllanthaceae described by Linnaeus in 1753. It is one of eight genera in the tribe Poranthereae.

They are monoecious herbs or subshrubs, native to semideserts and desert margins of the Americas, southern Europe, North Africa, and South Asia. Linnaeus took the name from Theophrastus, but it is not clear to which plant Theophrastus applied the name. Actually, the etymology of the genus name corresponds to the Ancient Greek word , meaning either "common purslane" (Portulaca oleracea) or "wild strawberry" (Fragaria vesca).

Systematics

Species list 
The Andrachne genus includes the following species.

Formerly included 
The following species were formerly included in Andrachne before being moved to the other genera Bischofia, Breynia, Bridelia, Cleistanthus, Leptopus, Meineckia, Notoleptopus, Phyllanthus, Phyllanthopsis, Pseudophyllanthus, and Sauropus.

References

External links
 Andrachne In: Species Plantarum, volume 2 At: Carl von Linné At: Authors At: Botanicus
 CRC World Dictionary of Plant Names: A-C At: Botany & Plant Science At: Life Science At: CRC Press
 Andrachne At:ING At: References At: NMNH Department of Botany At: Research and Collections At: Smithsonian National Museum of Natural History
 Eraclissa  and  Telephioides At: IPNI

Phyllanthaceae
Phyllanthaceae genera